Željko Cicović (born 2 September 1970) is a Serbian former professional footballer who played as a goalkeeper.

Club career
During his 16-year-long career, Cicović played for Rad (1989–1997) and Las Palmas (1997–2005). He won the Ricardo Zamora Trophy in the 1998–99 Segunda División.

International career
At international level, Cicović was capped six times for FR Yugoslavia. He was part of the team at UEFA Euro 2000, remaining an unused substitute throughout the tournament.

Honours
Las Palmas
 Segunda División: 1999–2000
Individual
 Ricardo Zamora Trophy: 1998–99 Segunda División
 Toulon Tournament Best Goalkeeper: 1992

References

External links
 
 
 
 

1970 births
Living people
Footballers from Belgrade
Yugoslav footballers
Serbia and Montenegro footballers
Serbian footballers
Association football goalkeepers
Yugoslavia under-21 international footballers
Serbia and Montenegro international footballers
UEFA Euro 2000 players
FK Rad players
UD Las Palmas players
Yugoslav First League players
First League of Serbia and Montenegro players
Segunda División players
La Liga players
Segunda División B players
Serbia and Montenegro expatriate footballers
Expatriate footballers in Spain
Serbia and Montenegro expatriate sportspeople in Spain